A staffroom or teachers' lounge is a room in a school or college. It may refer to a communal work area where teachers have their desk and prepare lessons if they do not have a personal office, or may be a common room where teachers and/or school staff can relax, discuss work, eat, drink and socialise while not in class.

See also

Mailroom
Staff room bullying

School terminology
Rooms